WellPoint Systems Inc., a Calgary-based public company, develops and supports software packages for the energy industry. The company's software is used in various applications including oil marketing, asset management and operations management.  WellPoint's energy software suite utilizes Dynamics AX and .NET architectures. The company also provides software and services under the BOLO, IDEAS International and iSoft brands.

WellPoint currently employs nearly 200 people in seven offices worldwide and is publicly traded on the TSX Venture Exchange, a public venture capital marketplace for emerging companies.

History
Founded in 1997, Calgary-based WellPoint Systems also has operations in Denver, CO; Houston, TX; Livingston, New Jersey, NJ; Tampa, FL; Tunis, Tunisia and Pretoria, South Africa. In 2006, WellPoint acquired IDEAS International, Inc. and then Bolo Systems, Inc. and iSoft Technologies (pty) Ltd. in 2007.  Wellpoint's software products include AX EAM, BOLO, Energy Broker, Energy Financial Management and IDEAS.  The company entered into receivership on January 31, 2011.

April 2011, Energy Solutions announced its plan to purchase Wellpoint Systems. Details of the acquisition were announced in their FAQ. P2 announced the completion of the WellPoint Systems acquisition on May 2, 2011.

Notable events
WellPoint was recently ranked 249th on  the 2008 Deloitte Technology Fast 500, a ranking of the 500 fastest growing technology, media, telecommunication and life sciences companies in North America; 28th on the Canadian Technology Fast 50, a ranking of the 50 fastest growing technology firms in Canada; 6th in the Over $20 Million Group for Alberta Venture's 2009 Fast Growth 50 list, a ranking of Alberta's 50 fastest growing companies working in information technology, real estate development, and manufacturing, as well as business, financial and oilfield services; and 96th in the 2009 Branham300 Top 250 Canadian ICT Companies, a ranking of top Canadian and multinational Information and Communication Technologies (ICT) companies operating in Canada.

References

External links
 WellPoint Systems Inc.
 BOLO Systems
 IDEAS
 AX EAM
 P2 Energy Solutions

Companies listed on the NEX Exchange
Defunct software companies of Canada